Phanda Kala is a village in the Bhopal district of Madhya Pradesh, India. It is located in the Huzur tehsil and the Phanda block. In 2014, it was adopted by minister Najma Heptullah under the Sansad Adarsh Gram Yojana, a rural development programme.

A regional station of the Indian Institute of Pulses Research is located in Phanda. The Harihar Hindu temple is located in Phanda Kalan, and houses a 960-year old manuscript handwritten by saint Dipaji Sardar. The semi-annual Guruparva festival organised here attracts thousands of devotees.

Demographics 

According to the 2011 census of India, Phanda Kala has 666 households. The effective literacy rate (i.e. the literacy rate of population excluding children aged 6 and below) is 67.99%.

References 

Villages in Huzur tehsil